Derbyshire County Cricket Club in 1905 was the cricket season when the English club  Derbyshire had been playing for thirty-four years. It was their eleventh season in the County Championship and  they won three matches to finish fourteenth in the Championship table.

1905 season

Derbyshire  played twenty games in the County Championship, one match against MCC and one against the touring Australians.  The captain for the year was Albert Lawton. Levi Wright was top scorer with over 1700 runs and four centuries and  Billy Bestwick took most wickets with over 100. However lacking greater depth, Derbyshire won just three matches in the County Championship and lost 16 which put them at fourteenth in the table.

The most significant addition to the Derbyshire squad in the season was George Buckston who though playing only one match in the 1905 season went on to become captain.  Also making their debuts were Frederic Hunter  who played regularly for three years and Herbert Cooper William Taylor and Robert Carlin  who played intermittently over five years. Arthur Hogg, John McDonald and George Walkden played in 1905 and also in 1906. Other players who  made their debut but played only in 1905 were George Maltby three matches, Joseph Cupitt George Marples and Guy Sparrow two matches and William Peach and William Bagguley one match each.
  
James Wright who had played in 1898 played his last single match in the season.

Matches

{| class="wikitable" width="100%"
! bgcolor="#efefef" colspan=6 | List of  matches
|- bgcolor="#efefef"
!No.
!Date
!V
!Result 
!Margin
!Notes
|- 
|1
 |  15 May 1905
| Yorkshire    Park Avenue Cricket Ground, Bradford 
|bgcolor="#FF0000"|Lost
| Innings and 61 runs
| FS Jackson 111; W Bestwick 5-91
|- 
|2
|18 May 1905
| Lancashire   County Ground, Derby  
|bgcolor="#FF0000"|Lost
| 161 runs
| SWA Cadman 6-27; I'Anson 5-52; Kermode 5-81 
|- 
|3
| 22 May 1905
| Essex   County Ground, Leyton 
|bgcolor="#FF0000"|Lost
| Innings and 1 run
| AE Lawton 112; McGahey 277; Tremlin 9-126; A Warren  5-139; Buckenham 6-59 
|- 
|4
| 01 Jun 1905
|  Sussex     County Ground, Derby
|bgcolor="#FFCC00"|Drawn
|
| LG Wright 149; A Warren  6-78; Cox 6-108 
|- 
|5
|12 Jun 1905
| Hampshire  County Ground, Southampton 
|bgcolor="#FF0000"|Lost
| 188 runs
| Bowell 101; W Bestwick 6-74; Hesketh-Pritchard 5-46 and 8-32 
|- 
|6
|15 Jun 1905
| Yorkshire   County Ground, Derby
|bgcolor="#00FF00"|Won
| 9 wickets
| A Warren  7-57 and 5-69; Ringrose 6-78 
|- 
|7
| 19 Jun 1905
| Northamptonshire  County Ground, Northampton  
|bgcolor="#FF0000"|Lost
| 23 runs
| GJ Thompson 5-66; East 6-33 
|- 
|8
|22 Jun 1905
|  Surrey Kennington Oval  
|bgcolor="#FF0000"|Lost
| 236 runs
| Goatly 147; Lees 6-59; W Bestwick 5-67; Knox 5-50 
|- 
|9
| 26 Jun 1905
| Essex   North Road Ground, Glossop  
|bgcolor="#FF0000"|Lost
| 7 wickets
| AJ Turner 103; W Bestwick 6-39; Tremlin 5-58 
|- 
|10
| 03 Jul 1905
| Leicestershire  Queen's Park, Chesterfield
|bgcolor="#FF0000"|Lost
| Innings and 135 runs
| CJB Wood 100; Odell 6-15 and 5-29; King 5-39
|- 
|11
|06 Jul 1905
| Nottinghamshire   Trent Bridge, Nottingham
|bgcolor="#FF0000"|Lost
| 8 wickets
| Hallam 6-48 
|- 
|12
|10 Jul 1905
| Australians  County Ground, Derby 
|bgcolor="#FF0000"|Lost
| 105 runs
| SWA Cadman 5-94; Armstrong 5-29; Cotter 6-63 
|- 
|13
|17 Jul 1905
| MCC    Lord's Cricket Ground, St John's Wood 
|bgcolor="#FF0000"|Lost
| Innings and 252 runs
|  TC O'Brien 153; CAL Payne 191; Trott 6-66
|- 
|14
|20 Jul 1905
| Northamptonshire  County Ground, Derby 
|bgcolor="#00FF00"|Won
| Innings and 50 runs
| LG Wright 195; East 5-127; A Warren  5-23; W Bestwick 5-23 and 7-108 
|- 
|15
|24 Jul 1905
| Warwickshire  Edgbaston, Birmingham 
|bgcolor="#FF0000"|Lost
| 7 wickets
| LG Wright 176 and 122; Quaife 176; W Bestwick 5-105 
|- 
|16
|27 Jul 1905
| Leicestershire  Aylestone Road, Leicester  
|bgcolor="#FF0000"|Lost
| 87 runs
| King 5-46; Jayes 9-78 
|- 
|17
|31 Jul 1905
| Warwickshire  County Ground, Derby 
|bgcolor="#00FF00"|Won
| Innings and 120 runs
| SWA Cadman 5-34 and 6-46; Santall 5-75 
|- 
|18
|07 Aug 1905
| Hampshire  County Ground, Derby 
|bgcolor="#FFCC00"|Drawn
|
| Llewellyn 102 and 100; W Bestwick 5-89 and 6-53; Ede 7-72 
|- 
|19
|10 Aug 1905
|  Sussex     County Ground, Hove 
|bgcolor="#FF0000"|Lost
| Innings and 41 runs
|  
|- 
|20
|14 Aug 1905
|  Surrey County Ground, Derby 
|bgcolor="#FF0000"|Lost
| 9 wickets
| Hayes 189; Crawford 119; EM Ashcroft 145; Lees 5-87 
|- 
|21
|17 Aug 1905
| Lancashire   Old Trafford, Manchester 
|bgcolor="#FFCC00"|Drawn
|
| AE Lawton 101; Poideven 102; Kermode 5-117; SWA Cadman 6-83 
|- 
|22
|21 Aug 1905
| Nottinghamshire   County Ground, Derby 
|bgcolor="#FF0000"|Lost
| 6 wickets
| W Bestwick 5-90; Wass 8-97 
|-

Statistics

County Championship batting averages

(a) Figures adjusted for non CC matches

Additionally, GH Wilson, RM Carlin and GH Marples played against MCC. Marples also played against the Australians

County Championship bowling averages

Wicket Keeping

 Joe Humphries  Catches 45,  Stumping  5

See also
Derbyshire County Cricket Club seasons
1905 English cricket season

References

1905 in English cricket
Derbyshire County Cricket Club seasons
English cricket seasons in the 20th century